There I Go Again is David Meece's thirteenth album.

Track listing 

Music by David Meece; Lyrics by  David Meece and Dwight Liles. Except "We Are The Reason" written by David Meece.

 "No Other Hope" - 5:31
 "Dancing With The Enemy" - 4:22
 "I Just Want To Be With You" - 3:45
 "I'll Be Waiting For You" - 5:02
 "Run" - 3:49
 "Things You Never Gave Me" - 4:43
 "Raise These Arms" - 3:39
 "There I Go Again" - 4:43
 "Help Me Stand" - 4:48
 "By The Waters" - 4:36
 "We Are The Reason" (Live) (CD only bonus track) - 4:42

Musicians 
 David Meece – lead vocals, backing vocals, acoustic piano, keyboards, programming, arrangements 
 Brian Hardin – programming, arrangements 
 Scott V. Smith – programming, arrangements 
 David Cleveland – guitars
 James Harrah – guitars
 Jimmy Johnson – bass 
 John Robinson – drums 
 Chris Meece – drums 
 Kelly Meece – backing vocals

Production 
 Brian Hardin – executive producer, producer, recording, mixing, mastering, art direction, design, layout (www.brianhardin.com) 
 David Meece – pre-production
 Scott V. Smith – pre-production
 Robert Zuckerman – artist photography
 Recorded at The Box and Wildwood Recording (Nashville, TN); SVS Productions (Pasadena, CA).

David Meece albums